Silhouette is a progressive rock band from Utrecht, the Netherlands. So far, the band has released five albums. The music they play is influenced by band such as Genesis, Pink Floyd, Marillion, but also by more recent music. The Dutch Oor Pop Encyclopedie lists Silhouette under the category of progressive rock, other sources refer to their music as neo-progressive rock.

Silhouette's album Beyond the Seventh Wave received the iO Pages Prog Award 2014 for the best prog album that was released in Belgium and the Netherlands in that year. The band's manager, Kathy Keller, of My Music Matters-MT promotion company was active during the release phase of the album. Silhouette left in 2017 for record label management.

Band members 
Current members
Brian de Graeve - vocals , guitar
Erik Laan - vocals keyboards, bass pedals
Rob van Nieuwenhuijzen - drums, percussion
Daniel van der Weijde - guitar
Jurjen Bergsma - bass

Live members
Bart Laan - guitar

Former members
Gerrit-Jan (GJ) Bloemink - bass (until 2014)
Jos Uffing - drums, vocals and acoustic guitars (until 2013)

Discography  
A-maze (2007)
Moods (2009)
Across the Rubicon (2012)
Beyond the Seventh Wave (2014)
Staging the Seventh Wave (2017, live album)
The World is Flat and Other Alternative Facts (2017)

References

External links 
Official website

Dutch progressive rock groups